The 8th Central American and Caribbean Junior Championships was held in Nassau, Bahamas, between 30 June-2 July 1988.

Medal summary
Medal winners are published by category: Junior A, Male, Junior A, Female, and Junior B. 
Complete results can be found on the World Junior Athletics History website.

Male Junior A (under 20)

Female Junior A (under 20)

Male Junior B (under 17)

Female Junior B (under 17)

Medal table (unofficial)

Participation (unofficial)

Detailed result lists can be found on the World Junior Athletics History website.  An unofficial count yields a number of about 223 athletes (125 junior (under-20) and 98 youth (under-17)) from about 13 countries:

 (5)
 (59)
 (2)
 (3)
 (3)
 (35)
 (13)
 México  (23)
 (5)
 (41)
 (3)
 (9)
 (22)

References

External links
Official CACAC Website
World Junior Athletics History

Central American and Caribbean Junior Championships in Athletics
International athletics competitions hosted by the Bahamas
Central American and Caribbean Junior Championships in Athletics
Central American and Caribbean Junior Championships in Athletics
1988 in youth sport